Gosari inscription or Butulan inscription is an inscription dated 1298 saka (1376 CE) located in the Butulan cave, limestone mountain region in Gosari village, Ujungpangkah, Gresik, East Java. Unlike other ancient inscription that usually carved on a large monolith stone, this inscriptions was carved on the cave wall.

The villagers from surrounding area were already aware of the existence of the inscription for quite a long time, however it was formally reported to local authority in 2004. Since 2005 further study was conducted and concluded that the inscription was connected to the Majapahit kingdom and written during the reign of king Hayam Wuruk. Historian suggested that Sang Rama Samadya probably was once an important  (knight), a palace courtier or an official in the Majapahit court that was defeated in court politics and lost the favour of the king. As the result he must endured an exile in this cave, and performed semadi (meditation) probably to pursue spiritual or martial art mastery.

Content 
Gosari inscription has been translated by Luthfi from Gadjah Mada University with archaeology team from Ministry of Culture and Tourism in 2005.

Translation 

 In the year 1298 (saka, 1376 CE) in Ambal
 at that time was inhabit by 
 
 the exiled one

Notes

References
Kompas. 27 July 2010.  Prasasti Gosari Terkait Dengan Majapahit. Kompas Jawa Timur page K

Inscriptions in Indonesia
14th-century inscriptions
Majapahit
Hinduism in Indonesia